Annah may refer to:

People with the given name
Annah Faulkner, Australian novelist
Annah Gela, South African politician
Annah Mac, New Zealand singer-songwriter, producer and musician
Annah May Soule, American academic 
Annah Robinson Watson, American author

Other uses
Annah-of-the-Shadows, a character from the 1999 role-playing video game Planescape: Torment
Ida Annah Ryan, American architect

See also

Anah, Iraq
Anna (disambiguation)